St. Jude's Episcopal Church is a historic Episcopal church located at 301 North Main Street in Monroe City, Monroe County, Missouri. It was built in 1867, with the south transept added in 1877 and two-story bell tower added in 1904.  It is an asymmetrical, one-story Gothic Revival style limestone building.  It features crenellation, stepped buttresses and lancet windows with stained glass.

It was listed on the National Register of Historic Places in 2000.

References

Episcopal church buildings in Missouri
Churches on the National Register of Historic Places in Missouri
Gothic Revival church buildings in Missouri
Churches completed in 1867
Buildings and structures in Monroe County, Missouri
19th-century Episcopal church buildings
National Register of Historic Places in Monroe County, Missouri